The Blériot-SPAD S.46 was a small French airliner of the 1920s, developed from the Blériot-SPAD S.33.  Like its predecessor, it was a conventional biplane that seated four passengers in an enclosed cabin while the pilot and occasionally a fifth passenger rode in an open cockpit.  The S.46 had a redesigned wing of longer span and a far more powerful engine.  The type was employed by Franco-Roumaine, which purchased 38 out of the 40 examples produced for use on their continental European routes.

In 1922 one of the S.46s, modified to use a more powerful  Lorraine 12E Courlis W-12 engine was redesignated S.86. In 1929 this was changed to a Hispano-Suiza engine in the same power range and redesignated S.126.

In 1925, the surviving 34 Franco-Roumaine aircraft were recalled to Blériot where they underwent remanufacture to incorporate various refinements. These refurbished aircraft were redesignated S.66. One of these aircraft was subsequently also modified to use a more powerful  Lorraine 12E Courlis W-12 engine and redesignated S.116.

Variants
S.46
Single-engined passenger airliner, powered by a single  Lorraine-Dietrich 12Da V-12 engine.
S.66
38 remanufactured S.46s. 
S.86
One S.46 was modified when it was fitted with the more powerful  Lorraine 12E Courlis W-12 engine.
S.116
One S.66 was modified with the more powerful  Renault 12Ja V-12 engine
S.126
The S.86 was further modified again, when it was fitted with a  Hispano-Suiza 12Ha V-12 engine.

Operators
 
 Franco-Roumaine (38 aircraft)

Specifications (S.46)

See also

References

 
 
 aviafrance.com

1920s French airliners
Blériot aircraft
Single-engined tractor aircraft
Biplanes
Aircraft first flown in 1921